Yorkshire, North
King G
King G
King